Edwin Charles Dimes (June 23, 1904 – September 28, 1999) was an American baseball outfielder in the Negro leagues. He played with the Dayton Marcos in 1926 and the Akron Black Tyrites in 1933.

References

External links
 and Seamheads

Akron Black Tyrites players
Dayton Marcos players
1904 births
1999 deaths
Baseball players from Louisiana
Baseball outfielders
20th-century African-American sportspeople